Curl Up and Die, formed in late 1998, is an American metalcore band from Las Vegas, Nevada.

History 
After demos in 1998 and 1999, Curl Up and Die recorded its first release in early 2000, an album called 1998. An EP, The Only Good Bug Is A Dead Bug, was picked up by Status Recordings in early 2001. Prior to forming Curl Up and Die, vocalist Mike Minnick was a founding member of Vegas grindcore band The Weirding Way, playing drums.

The group signed with Revelation Records in 2001 and their debut full-length CD, Unfortunately, We're Not Robots, was released in May 2002. Two EPs, We May Be Through With the Past (on Status) and But the Past Ain't Through With Us (on Revelation) were released, as well as one more album, The One Above All, The End Of All That Is, before the band broke up in late 2005.

On July 12, 2012, the group sent a statement to Lambgoat.com that they will be getting back together, with more details forthcoming.

Vocalist Mike Minnick currently provides vocals for the baseball-themed grindcore band Puig Destroyer and post-hardcore supergroup Less Art. Corcoran and Fuchs also started a grindcore-influenced sideproject called Red Vom.

Band members

Latest members 
Matt Fuchs – guitar
Ryan Hartery – bass
Mike Minnick – vocals
Keil Corcoran – drums

Former members 
Jesse Fitts – drums
Geoff Bergman – bass (went on to play in Poison the Well)
Jon Brown – guitar
Mike Pinaud – drums
Gustavo Mendoza – bass
Gavan Nelson – bass

Discography

Albums 
Unfortunately, We're Not Robots (Revelation, 2002)
The One Above All, the End of All That Is (Revelation, 2005)

EPs 
The Only Good Bug Is a Dead Bug (Status, 2000)
1998 (Status, 2001)
We May Be Through with the Past... (Status, 2003)
But the Past Ain't Through with Us (Revelation, 2003)

References

External links 
MySpace Site

Musical groups established in 1998
Musical groups disestablished in 2005
Musical groups from Las Vegas
Metalcore musical groups from Nevada